Edward Blatchford (born September 1, 1955) is an American actor best known for his role as Peter Collins from 1998 to 2000 in the sitcom Malibu, CA, produced by Peter Engel. He also worked with Engel on three other television series, guest starring in Saved by the Bell, Hang Time and City Guys. Ed was one of the founding members of Chicago's American Blues Theatre  

He also guest starred in the series Crime Story, The Adventures of Brisco County, Jr. and JAG. His film credits include The Last of the Mohicans (1992) and Nowhere to Run (1993).

Career After Acting

Saved by the Belding 

In 2010, Blatchford wrote and starred in the independent short film Saved by the Belding. The film parodied his guest appearance on Saved by the Bell where he played Rod Belding, brother of Richard Belding (Dennis Haskins).

Rainmaker 

Ed was nominated for a 2016 Joseph Jefferson (Equity) Award for Director of a Play for "The Rainmaker" at the American Blues Theater in Chicago, Illinois.

Personal life 

Blatchford currently works as a real estate agent for Surterre Properties in Newport Beach, California.

Filmography

References

External links

Ed Blatchford at TV Guide

20th-century American male actors
21st-century American male actors
American male film actors
American male television actors
Living people
Place of birth missing (living people)
1972 births